Essexville is a city in Bay County in the U.S. state of Michigan. The population at 3,478 at the 2010 census. Located along the Saginaw River, Essexville is part of the Saginaw, Midland, and Bay City metropolitan area.

History
Essexville is named after Ransom P. Essex, a local settler.  It was first platted in 1867. The Essexville Post Office 
opened on Feb 27, 1871. The Post Office was closed from January 20 to February 24 in 1879. It was incorporated as a village in 1883 within Hampton Township and as a city in 1934.

Geography
It is also directly on the Saginaw River.

Demographics

2010 census
As of the census of 2010, there were 3,478 people, 1,437 households, and 1,016 families residing in the city. The racial makeup of the city was 95.5% White, 0.9% African American, 0.6% Native American, 0.8% Asian, 0.8% from other races, and 1.4% from two or more races. Hispanic or Latino of any race were 3.0% of the population.

There were 1,437 households, of which 31.0% had children under the age of 18 living with them, 54.1% were married couples living together, 11.1% had a female householder with no husband present, 5.4% had a male householder with no wife present, and 29.3% were non-families. 25.5% of all households were made up of individuals, and 11.6% had someone living alone who was 65 years of age or older. The average household size was 2.42 and the average family size was 2.87.

The median age in the city was 42.3 years. 22.8% of residents were under the age of 18; 7.1% were between the ages of 18 and 24; 23.8% were from 25 to 44; 29.8% were from 45 to 64; and 16.6% were 65 years of age or older. The gender makeup of the city was 47.6% male and 52.4% female.

2000 census
As of the census of 2000, there were 3,766 people, 1,487 households, and 1,088 families residing in the city. The racial makeup of the city was 96.34% White, 0.53% African American, 0.80% Native American, 0.58% Asian, 0.61% from other races, and 1.14% from two or more races. Hispanic or Latino of any race were 2.07% of the population.

There were 1,487 households, out of which 34.2% had children under the age of 18 living with them, 60.1% were married couples living together, 10.2% had a female householder with no husband present, and 26.8% were non-families. 23.8% of all households were made up of individuals, and 13.8% had someone living alone who was 65 years of age or older.  The average household size was 2.53 and the average family size was 2.98.

In the city, the population was spread out, with 25.4% under the age of 18, 6.8% from 18 to 24, 25.1% from 25 to 44, 26.3% from 45 to 64, and 16.4% who were 65 years of age or older.  The median age was 40 years. For every 100 females, there were 90.4 males.  For every 100 females age 18 and over, there were 85.4 males.

The median income for a household in the city was $43,750, and the median income for a family was $55,610. Males had a median income of $46,037 versus $30,417 for females. The per capita income for the city was $25,060.  About 2.7% of families and 4.4% of the population were below the poverty line, including 2.7% of those under age 18 and 5.8% of those age 65 or over.

Education
Public education in Essexville is provided by the Essexville-Hampton School District.

Cultural attractions

Heritage House is a modest two-story residence that is preserved as a "fine example of a mid-west country home," open to the public.

Hampton Square Mall, the first shopping mall in the Bay City metro area, was located in Essexville. The mall closed in 2010.

References

External links
 City of Essexville website
 Bay-Journal — Hampton Township & Essexville History 

Cities in Bay County, Michigan
Saginaw River
Populated riverside places in the United States
Populated places established in 1883
1883 establishments in Michigan